Ruckersville is a census-designated place (CDP) in Greene County, Virginia, United States, located in a rural area north of Charlottesville. The population as of the 2020 Estimate was 1,321, a 17.7% increase from the 2010 census with 1,141. The community lies amidst hills, mountain views, trees, and farmland. It is located at the intersection of two major highways, north–south U.S. Route 29 and east–west U.S. Route 33. It was founded in 1732, by the same family that established Ruckersville, Georgia.

Geography
Ruckersville is located in southeastern Greene County.

Transportation 
Ruckersville has major routes going through it. They are U.S. Route 29, and U.S. Route 33.

Demographics
As of the census of 2010, there were 1,141 people, 461 households, and 316 families residing in the CDP. The racial makeup of the town was 85.5% White, 6.9% African American, 0.6% Native American, 1.1% Asian, 2.7% some other race, and 3.2% from two or more races. Hispanic or Latino of any race were 6.1% of the population.

There were 461 households in the CDP, out of which 30.6% had children under the age of 18 living with them, 52.5% were headed by married couples living together, 10.8% had a female householder with no husband present, and 31.5% were non-families. 26.5% of all households were made up of individuals, and 8.2% were someone living alone who was 65 years of age or older. The average household size was 2.48, and the average family size was 2.93.

In the CDP, 23.0% of the population were under the age of 18, 7.1% were from age 18 to 24, 22.8% were from 25 to 44, 28.6% were from 45 to 64, and 18.5% were 65 years of age or older. The median age was 43.5 years. For every 100 females there were 96.0 males. For every 100 females age 18 and over, there were 94.0 males.

For the period 2011–15, the estimated median annual income for a household in the CDP was $53,962, and the median income for a family was $68,043. The per capita income for the CDP was $24,082.

Ruckersville Parkway
In 2005, a pair of local politicians proposed a road, dubbed the "Ruckersville Parkway", that would directly connect Ruckersville to the southern edge of Charlottesville. However, objections from residents and planners caused the proposal to fail.

References

Census-designated places in Greene County, Virginia
Populated places established in 1734
1734 establishments in the Thirteen Colonies